Moyse Antoine Pierre Jean Bayle (16 July 1755, in Chêne – between 1812 and 1815) was a French politician of the French Revolution.

Life

Before the Convention
Bayle was member of Marseille's Jacobins in 1790, he protected Charles-Jean-Marie-Barbaroux which he allowed to take municipal functions.

Bayle at the Convention

Bayle the Montagnard
He took part in the National Convention in 1792 for the Bouches-du-Rhône department winning 376 seats out of 725.  When he was in Paris, he split from the Barbaroux and joined the Mountain.

Mission to Marseille
In March 1793, he took part in a mission to the Drôme department in Marseille which was in charge with Joseph Antoine Boisset and added 300,000 men necessary to defend the area.

When he returned to Paris, Bayle was reported by the Committee of Public Safety on 23 May 1793 which denounced Marseille's popular tribunal.

On the Committee of Public Safety

He was member of the Committee of General Security on 13 August 1793, he was later president of the National Convention on 19 October for two weeks.

Plotter against Robespierre

Thermidorian Reaction
He evenly had the strength to defend Barère, Billaud-Varenne, Collot d'Herbois and Vadier about their trails

Decline and death
His final work was controlling the rights of the Ourthe department.

He disappeared from sources in 1811.

See also
Politics of France

References
 François Brunel, Les derniers Montagnards et l'unité révolutionnaire (The Right Mountainer and a United Revolutionary, AHRF no. 229, 1977
Régis Bertrand, Moyse Antoine Pierre Jean Bayle, in Patrick Cabanel and André Encrevé (dir.), Dictionnaire biographique des protestants français de 1787 à nos jours, volume 1 : A-C, Max Chaleil, Paris, 2015, p. 207
Albert Soboul, Dictionnaire historique de la Révolution française (Historical Dictionary of the French Revolution), Paris, PUF, Quadrige, 2005, 

Articles with empty sections from July 2010
All articles with empty sections
1755 births
1815 deaths
Deputies to the French National Convention
Regicides of Louis XVI
Presidents of the National Convention